James Ewing (August 3, 1736 – March 1, 1806) was a Pennsylvania soldier, statesman, and politician of the Colonial, Revolutionary and post-Revolutionary eras. He served in the Pennsylvania General Assembly and also as Vice-President of Pennsylvania, a position comparable to that of Lieutenant Governor.

Early life and family
James Ewing was born in 1736 in Lancaster County, Pennsylvania, the son of Thomas Ewing and Susanna Howard. Thomas Ewing was an Ulster-Scottish immigrant and had served in the Assembly when James was young. James married Patience Wright.

Military service
In 1755 young Ewing joined General Edward Braddock’s expedition into western Pennsylvania, and in 1758 he served as a lieutenant in the Pennsylvania militia.

On July 4, 1776, Ewing was commissioned a brigadier general in the Pennsylvania militia. Characterized by historian David Hackett Fischer as a "hard-driving Scotch-Irish border chieftain", Ewing commanded a brigade of five regiments at the time of George Washington's crossing of the Delaware River on the night of December 25–26, 1776, in a surprise attack on the Hessian forces in Trenton, New Jersey. Ewing's force, positioned directly across from Trenton, was unable to cross the river because of the ice. Although Ewing has sometimes been  criticized by historians for failing to join Washington on the other side of the river, Fischer argues that no one could have crossed the river at that point that night. Washington did not blame General Ewing, writing that "the Quantity of Ice was so great, that tho' he did every thing in his power to effect it, he could not get over."

Political service
Ewing represented York County in the General Assembly from 1771 through 1776. In early 1776 he was one of the few Assemblymen calling for an immediate break with Great Britain. It was, in part, his enthusiasm for Independence that led to his general’s commission on July 4.

Following Independence Ewing aligned himself with wealthy business interests, as a Republican and Anti-Constitutionalist (the latter movement being opposed to the unicameral legislature of Pennsylvania’s 1776 Constitution), and later as a Federalist. In 1781 he won a seat on the Supreme Executive Council of Pennsylvania. On November 7, 1782, Ewing was elected Vice-President of Pennsylvania, earning thirty nine votes to the thirty four won by the incumbent, James Potter. (The position of Vice-President is analogous to the modern office of Lieutenant Governor.) He was unanimously reelected on November 6, 1783, and served until November 6, 1784, when he was succeeded by James Irvine. At one day short of two years, his vice-presidential term was one of the longest in the history of that short-lived office.

In 1784 Ewing served a one-year term in the General Assembly.

As Vice-President of Pennsylvania Ewing served as an ex officio member of the Board of Trustees of the University of Pennsylvania. In 1783 he also served as a trustee of Dickinson College in Carlisle, Pennsylvania. In 1789 he chaired a committee seeking to improve navigation on the Susquehanna River.

In 1795 he returned to elected office, as a Federalist member of the State Senate.

James Ewing died at his home near York, Pennsylvania, in 1806.

References

External links
Biography at Virtualology.com

1736 births
1806 deaths
People from Lancaster County, Pennsylvania
People of colonial Pennsylvania
American people of Scotch-Irish descent
Pennsylvania Federalists
Lieutenant Governors of Pennsylvania
Pennsylvania state senators
Politicians from York, Pennsylvania
University of Pennsylvania
Dickinson College
People of Pennsylvania in the French and Indian War
Militia generals in the American Revolution
Pennsylvania militiamen in the American Revolution